is a former Japanese football player.

Club career
Ota was educated at and played for Shimizu Commercial High School and Fukuoka University.

After graduating from the university in 2002, Ota joined J2 League side Avispa Fukuoka. His first appearance in J2 League came on September 11, 2002, against Mito HollyHock. He scored his first professional goal on July 26, 2003, against Albirex Niigata. In April 2004, he crashed into the goal post and damaged his spleen as he scored against Omiya Ardija. Because of this injury, he was sidelined for more than three months. Although he was instrumental in Avispa's promotion in the 2005 season by playing 22 games and scoring 2 goals, he was released from the club. He played the 2006 season with fellow J2 side Thespa Kusatsu. The Minnesota Thunder signed him in February 2007, but he returned to Japan with V-Varen Nagasaki in 2008. He retired from the game at the end of the 2008 season.

National team career
Ota represented Japan for the 2001 Summer Universiade held in Beijing where the team won the title beating Ukraine in the final. He played 5 matches in the tournament.

Club statistics

References

External links

1979 births
Living people
Fukuoka University alumni
Association football people from Shizuoka Prefecture
Japanese footballers
J2 League players
Avispa Fukuoka players
Thespakusatsu Gunma players
V-Varen Nagasaki players
USL First Division players
Minnesota Thunder players
Expatriate soccer players in the United States
Association football forwards
Japanese expatriate footballers
Japanese expatriate sportspeople in the United States